San Luis is a populated place situated in Pima County, Arizona, United States. It is one of two locations in Pima County with this name. Its historical O'odham name was Ñu:wĭ Ki:, meaning "Buzzard's House", but in 1939 the O'odham chose to adopt the name of the saint instead. It has also been known as Cobabi and Noli.

Notes

References

Populated places in Pima County, Arizona